Thalamiflorae is a historical grouping of dicotyledons, arranged in the De Candolle system and in the Bentham and Hooker system. This group was named and published well before internationally accepted rules for botanical nomenclature. In these systems, a family was indicated as "ordo", and modern rules of botanical nomenclature accept that as meaning a family rather than an order.[Article 18.2] Family names have also since been standardized (most family names now end in -aceae).

Previous group 
Polypetalae.
Dome shaped plants with unexpanded flower receptacle (thalamus), polysepalous, hypogenous with a superior ovary

Thalamiflorae detailed view of subclass
Within the dicotyledons ("classis prima Dicotyledoneae") the systems recognize this as subclass 1. Thalamiflorae. The full Ordo, Tribe and  genera are shown below

Ordo 1. Ranunculaceae
Tribe 1. Clematideae
 Genus: Clematis, Naravelia
Tribe 2. Anemoneae
 Genus: Thalictrum, Tetractis, Anemone, Hepática, Hydrastis, Knowltonia, Adonis, Hamadryas
Tribe 3. Ranunculeae
 Genus: Myosurus, Ceratocephalus, Ranunculus, Ficaria
Tribe 4. Helleboreae
 Genus: Caltha, Trollius, Isopyrum, Enemion, Garidella, Nigella, Aquilegia, Delphinium, Aconitum, e outros.
Tribe 5. Paeoniaceae
 Genus: Actaea, Zanthorhiza, Paeonia.
Ordo 2. Dilleniaceae
Tribe 1. Delimeae
 Genus: Tetracera, Davilla, Doliocarpus, Delima, Curatella, Trachytella, Recchia
Tribe 2. Dilleneae
 Genus: Pachinema, Hemistemma, Pleurandra, Candollea, Adrastaea, Hibbertia, Wormia, Colbertia, Dillenia
Ordo 3. Magnoliaceae
Tribe 1. Illicieae
 Genus: Illicium, Temus, Drimys, Tasmannia
Tribe 2. Magnolieae
 Genus: Mayna, Michelia, Magnólia, Talauma, Liriodendron
Ordo 4. Annonaceae
 Genus: Kadsusa, Annona, Monodora, Asimina, Porcelia, Uvaria, Unona, Xylopia, Guatteria.
Ordo 5. Menispermaceae
Tribe 1. Lardizabaleae
 Genus: Lardizabala, Stauntonia, Burasaia
Tribe 2. Menispermeae
 Genus: Spirospermum, Cocculus, Pselium, Cissampelos, Menispermum, Abuta, Trichoa, Agdestis
Tribe 3. Schizandreae
 Genus: Schisandra
Ordo 6. Berberideae
 Genus: Berberis, Mahonia, Nandina, Leontice, Epimedium, Diphylleia
Ordo 7. Podophyllaceae
Tribe 1. Podophylleae
 Genus: Podophyllum, Jeffersonia, Achlys
Tribe 2. Hydropeltideae
 Genus: Cabomba, Hydropeltis
Ordo 8. Nymphaeaceae
Tribe 1. Nelumboneae
 Genus: Nelumbium
Tribe 2. Nymphaeeae
 Genus: Euryale ferox, Nymphaea, Nuphar
Ordo 9. Papaveraceae
 Genus: Papaver, Argemone, Meconopsis, Sanguinária, Bocconia, Roemeria, Glaucium, Chelidonium, Hypecoum
Ordo 10. Fumariaceae
 Genus: Diclytra, Adlumia, Cysticaptnos, Corydalis, Sarcocapnos, Fumaria
Ordo 11. Cruciferae
Sub-ordo 1. Pleurorhizeae
Tribe 1. Arabideae
 Genus: Mathiola, Cheiranthus, Nasturtium, Leptocarpaea, Notoceras, Barbarea, Stevenia, Braya, Turritis, Arabis, Macropodium, Cardamine, Pteroneurum, Dentaria, Neuroloma
Tribe 2. Alyssineae
 Genus: Lunaria, Savignya, Ricotia, Farsetia, Berteroa, Aubrieta, Versicaria, Schivereckia, Alyssum, Meniocus, Clypeola, Peltaria, Petrocallis, Draba, Erophila, Cochlearia
Tribe 3. Thlaspideae
 Genus: Thlaspi, Capsella, Hutchinsia, Teesdalia, Iberis, Biscutella, Megacarpaea, Cremolobus, Menonvillea
Tribe 4. Euclidieae
 Genus: Euclidium, Ochthodium, Pugionium
Tribe 5. Anastaticeae
 Genus: Anastatica, Morettia
Tribe 6. Cakilineae
 Genus: Cakile, Cordylocarpus, Chorispora
Sub-ordo 2. Notorhizeae
Tribe 7. Sisymbreae
 Genus: Malcomia, Hesperis, Andreoskia, Sisymbrium, Alliaria, Erysimum, Leptaleum, Stanleya
Tribe 8. Camelineae
 Genus: Stenopetalum, Camelina, Eudema, Neslia
Tribe 9. Lepidineae
 Genus: Senebiera, Lepidium, Bivonaea, Eunomia, Aethionema
Tribe 10. Isatideae
 Genus: Aphragmus, Tauscheria, Isatis, Myagrum, Sobolewskia
Tribe 11. Anchonieae
 Genus: Goldbachia, Anchonium, Sterigma
Sub-ordo 3. Orthoploceae
Tribe 12. Brassiceae
 Genus: Brassica, Sinapis, Moricandia, Diplotaxis, Eruca
Tribe 13. Velleae
 Genus: Vella, Boleum, Carrichtera, Succowia
Tribe 14. Psychineae
 Genus: Schouwia, Psychine
Tribe 15. Zilleae
 Genus: Zilla, Muricaria, Calepina
Tribe 16. Raphaneae
 Genus: Crambe, Rapistrum, Didesmus, Enarthrocarpus, Raphanus
Sub-ordo 4. Spirolobeae
Tribe 17. Buniadeae
 Genus: Bunias
Tribe 18. Erucariae
 Genus: Erucaria
Sub-ordo 5. Diplecolobeae
Tribe 19. Heliophileae
 Genus: Chamira, Heliophila
Tribe 20. Subularieae
 Genus: Subularia
Tribe 21. Brachycarpeae
 Genus: Brachycarpaea
Ordo 12. Capparideae
Tribe 1. Cleomeae
 Genus: Cleomella, Peritoma, Gynandropsis, Cleome, Polanisia
Tribe 2. Cappareae
 Genus: Crataeva, Niebuhria, Boscia, Cadaba, Schepperia, Sodada, Capparis, Stephania, Morisonia, Thylachium, Hermupoa, Maerua
Ordo 13. Flacourtianeae
Tribe 1. Patrisieae
 Genus: Ryanaea, Patrisia
Tribe 2. Flacourtieae
 Genus: Flacourtia, Roumea, Stigmarota
Tribe 3. Kiggelarieae
 Genus: Kiggelaria, Melicytus, Hydnocarpus
Tribe 4. Erythrospermeae
 Genus: Erythrospermum
Ordo 14. Bixineae
 Genus: Bixa, Banara, Laetia, Prockia, Ludia, Azara
Ordo 15. Cistineae
 Genus: Cistus, Helianthemum, Hudsonia, Lechea
Ordo 16. Violarieae
Tribe 1. Violeae
 Genus: Calyptrion, Noisettia, Glossarrhen, Viola, Solea, Pombalia, Pigea, Ionidium, Hybanthus
Tribe 2. Alsodineae
 Genus: Conohoria, Rinorea, Alsodeia, Ceranthera, Pentaloba, Lavradia, Physiphora, Hymenanthera
Tribe 3. Sauvageae
 Genus: Sauvagesia, Piparea
Ordo 17. Droseraceae
 Genus: Drosera, Aldrovanda, Romanzowia, Byblis, Roridula, Drosophyllum, Dionaea, Parnassia
Ordo 18. Polygaleae
 Genus: Polygala, Salomonia, Comesperma, Badiera, Soulamea, Muraltia, Mundia, Monnina, Bredemeyera
Ordo 19. Tremandreae
 Genus: Tetratheca, Tremandra
Ordo 20. Pittosporeae
 Genus: Billardiera, Pittosporum, Bursaria, Senacia
Ordo 21. Frankeniaceae
 Genus: Frankenia, Beatsonia, Luxemburgia
Ordo 22. Caryophylleae
Tribe 1. Sileneae
 Genus: Gypsophila, Banffya, Dianthus, Saponaria, Cucubalus, Silene, Lychnis, Velezia, Drypis
Tribe 2. Alsineae
 Genus: Ortegia, Gouffeia, Buffonia, Sagina, Hymenella, Moehringia, Elatine, Bergia, Mollugo, Physa, Holosteum, Spergula, Larbrea, Drymaria, Stellaria, Arenaria, Cerastium, Cherleria, Spergulastrum, Hydropityon
Ordo 23. Lineae
 Genus: Linum, Radiola
Ordo 24. Malvaceae
 Genus: Malope, Malva, Kitaibelia, Althaea, Lavatera, Malachra, Urena, Pavonia, Malvaviscus, Lebretonia, Hibiscus, Thespesia, Gossypium, Redoutea, Fugosia, Senra, Lopimia, Palavia, Cristaria, Anoda, Periptera, Sida, Lagunea, Ingenhouzia
Ordo 25. Bombaceae
 Genus: Helicteres, Myrodia, Plagianthus, Matisia, Pourretia, Montezuma, Ophelus, Adansonia, Carolinea, Bombax, Eriodendron, Chorisia, Durio, Ochroma, Cheirostemon
Ordo 26. Byttneriaceae
Tribe 1. Sterculieae
 Genus: Sterculia, Triphaca, Heritiera
Tribe 2. Byttnerieae
 Genus: Theobroma, Abroma, Guazuma, Glossostemon, Commersonia, Byttneria, Ayenia, Kleinhovia
Tribe 3. Lasiopetaleae
 Genus: Seringia, Lasiopetalum, Guichenotia, Thomasia, Keraudrenia
Tribe 4. Hermannieae
 Genus: Melochia, Riedleia, Waltheria, Altheria, Hermannia, Mahernia
Tribe 5. Dombeyaceae
 Genus: Ruizia, Pentapetes, Assonia, Dombeya, Melhania, Trochetia, Pterospermum, Astrapaea, Kydia, Gluta
Tribe 6. Wallichieae
 Genus: Eriolaena, Wallichia, Goethea
Ordo 27. Tiliaceae
 Genus: Sparrmannia, Abatia, Heliocarpus, Anthichorus, Corchorus, Honckenya, Triumfetta, Grewia, Columbia, Tilia, Diplophractum, Muntingia, Apeiba, Sloanea, Ablania, Gyrostemon, Christiana, Alegria, Luhea, Vatica, Espera, Wikstroemia, Berrya
Ordo 28. Elaeocarpeae
 Genus: Elaeocarpus, Aceratium, Dicera, Friesia, Vallea, Tricuspidaria, Decadia
Ordo 29. Chlenaceae
 Genus: Sarcolaena, Leptolaena, Schizolaena, Rhodolaena, Hugonia
Ordo 30. Ternstroemiaceae
Tribe 1. Ternstroemieae
 Genus: Ternstroemia
Tribe 2. Freziereae
 Genus: Cleyera, Freziera, Eurya, Lettsomia
Tribe 3. Sauraujeae
 Genus: Saurauja, Apatelia
Tribe 4. Laplaceae
 Genus: Cochlospermum, Laplacea, Ventenatia
Tribe 5. Gordonieae
 Genus: Malachodendron, Stewartia, Gordonia
Ordo 31. Camellieae
 Genus: Camellia
Ordo 32. Olacineae
 Genus: Olax, Spermaxyrum, Fissilia, Heisteria, Ximenia, Pseudaleia, Pseudaleioides, Icacina
Ordo 33. Aurantiaceae
 Genus: Atalantia, Triphasia, Limonia, Cookia, Murraya, Aglaia, Bergera, Clausena, Glycosmis, Feronia, Aegle, Citrus
Ordo 34. Hypericineae
Sub-ordo 1. Hypericineae verae
Tribe 1. Vismieae
 Genus: Haronga, Vismia
Tribe 2. Hypericeae
 Genus: Androszemum, Hypericum, Lancretia, Ascyrum
Sub-ordo 2. Hypericineae anomalae
 Genus: Carpodontos, Eucryphia
Ordo 35. Guttiferae
Tribe 1. Clusieae
 Genus: Mahurea, Marila, Godoya, Clusia
Tribe 2. Garcinieae
 Genus: Marialva, Micranthera, Garcinia
Tribe 3. Calophylleae
 Genus: Mammea, Stalagmitis, Mesua, Calophyllum
Tribe 4. Symphonieae
 Genus: Canella, Moronobea, Chrysopia, Macanea, Singana, Rheedia, Macoubea, Chloromyron
Ordo 36. Marcgraviaceae
Sub-ordo 1. Marcgravieae
 Genus: Antholoma, Marcgravia
Sub-ordo 2. Noranteae
 Genus: Norantea, Ruyschia
Ordo 37. Hippocrateaceae
 Genus: Hippocratea, Anthodon, Raddisia, Salacia, Johnia, Trigonia, Lacepedea
Ordo 38. Erythroxyleae
 Genus: Erythroxylum, Sethia
Ordo 39. Malpighiaceae
Tribe 1. Malpighieae
 Genus: Malpighia, Byrsonima, Bunchosia, Galphimia, Caucanthus
Tribe 2. Hiptageae
 Genus: Hiptage, Tristellateia, Thryallis, Aspicarpa, Gaudichaudia, Camarea
Tribe 3. Banisterieae
 Genus: Hiraea, Triopteris, Tetrapteris, Banisteria, Heteropteris, Niota
Ordo 40. Acerineae
 Genus: Acer, Negundo
Ordo 41. Hippocastaneae
 Genus: Aesculus, Pavia
Ordo 42. Rhizoboleae
 Genus: Caryocar
Ordo 43. Sapindaceae
Tribe 1. Paullinieae
 Genus: Cardiospermum, Urvillaea, Serjania, Paullinia
Tribe 2. Sapindeae
 Genus: Sapindus, Blighia, Talisia, Matayba, Aporetica, Schmidelia, Euphoria, Thouinia, Toulicia, Cupania, Tina, Cossignia, Hypelate, Melicocca, Stadmannia
Tribe 3. Dodonaeaceae
 Genus: Koelreuteria, Amirola, Dodonaea, Alectryon, Eystathes, Racaria, Valentinia, Pedicellia, Ratonia, Enourea
Ordo 44. Meliaceae
Tribe 1. Melieae
 Genus: Ceruma, Humiria, Turraea, Quivisia, Strigilia, Sandoricum, Melia
Tribe 2. Trichilieae
 Genus: Trichilia, Ekebergia, Guarea, Heynea
Tribe 3. Cedreleae
 Genus: Cedrela, Swietenia, Chloroxylon, Flindersia, Carapa
Ordo 45. Ampelideae
Tribe 1. Viniferae (Sarmentaceae)
 Genus: Cissus, Ampelopsis, Vitis
Tribe 2. Leeaceae
 Genus: Leea, Lasianthera
Ordo 46. Geraniaceae
 Genus: Rhynchotheca, Monsonia, Geranium, Erodium, Pelargonium
Ordo 47. Tropaeoleae
 Genus: Tropaeolum
Ordo 48. Balsamineae
 Genus: Balsamina, Impatiens
Ordo 49. Oxalideae
 Genus: Averrhoa, Biophytum, Oxalis, Ledocarpum
Ordo 50. Zygophylleae
 Genus: Tribulus, Fagonia, Larrea, Zygophyllum, Gualacum, Porlieria, Chitonia, Biebersteunia, Melianthus, Balanites
Ordo 51. Rutaceae
Tribe 1. Diosmeae
 Genus: Ruta, Peganum, Dictamnus, Calodendrum, Diosma, Empleurum, Diplolaena, Correa, Phebalium, Crowea, Eriostemon, Philotheca, Boronia, Cyminosma, Zieria, Melicope, Elaphrium, Choisya, Evodia, Zanthoxylum, Pilocarpus, Spiranthera, Almeidea
Tribe 2. Cusparieae
 Genus: Monniera, Ticorea, Galipea, Erythrochiton, Diglottis, Barraldeia, Hortia
Ordo 52. Simarubeae
 Genus: Quassia, Simaruba, Simaba, Raputia
Ordo 53. Ochnaceae
 Genus: Ochna, Comphia, Walkera, Elvasia, Castela
Ordo 54. Coriarieae
 Genus: Coriaria

References

Historically recognized angiosperm taxa